TCS may refer to:

Organisations
 Tata Consultancy Services, an IT company headquartered in India 
 Taxpayers for Common Sense, a US nonpartisan federal budget watchdog organization
 TCS Courier, a Pakistani courier service
 Touring Club Suisse, a Swiss automobilists' organization
 Trade Commissioner Service, part of the Canadian Department of Foreign Affairs and International Trade
 Trilateral Cooperation Secretariat, between China, Japan, and South Korea

Schools
 Tallassee City School District (Tallassee City Schools), Alabama, US
 Tallavana Christian School, Florida, US
 The Covenant School (disambiguation)
 Tokyo Chinese School, Japan
 Townsville Cathedral School, Australia
 Trinity Christian School (disambiguation)
 Trinity College School, Canada
Teignmouth Community School, Uk

Media
 Telecorporación Salvadoreña, a television network in El Salvador
 Television Corporation of Singapore, now part of MediaCorp TV
 Terrestrial Trunked Radio (Tetra Connectivity Server) from Cassidian
 The Cambridge Student, a Cambridge University student newspaper
 TCS Daily, a former online magazine

Science and technology
 Tethered spinal cord syndrome
 Treacher Collins syndrome
 Theoretical computer science, a subset of general computer science and mathematics
 Theoretical Computer Science, a scientific journal about the above topic
 Tactical Control System, protocols for unmanned aerial vehicles
 DEC Technical Character Set, a character set supported by various DEC terminals
 Test Case Specification, as defined in IEEE 829
 Thermal control subsystem
 Track control system
 Traction control system
 Centralized traffic control or traffic control system, in North American railroading
 TV Camera Set, Northrop Corporation AAX-1 optical system,
 Trichlorosilane, an inorganic chemical compound

Other uses
 Taking Children Seriously, a parenting movement and educational philosophy
 Teaching Company Scheme or Knowledge Transfer Partnerships, a part UK government-funded programme
 Torres Strait Creole has the ISO 639 code tcs
 Turkish Cypriots (TCs)